The discography of Lee Hyori consists of six studio albums and twenty-four singles. Since breaking away from Fin.K.L in 2003, Lee has sold over 400,000 albums South Korea.

Studio albums

Singles

Other charted songs

Music videos

Notes

References

Discographies of South Korean artists